Daru is the capital of the Western Province of Papua New Guinea.

Daru may also refer to:

 Daru Island, an island in the Western Province of Papua New Guinea
 Daru Urban LLG, Papua New Guinea
 Pierre Antoine Noël Bruno, comte Daru, a French soldier and statesman, (1767–1829)
 Napoléon, comte Daru, a French soldier and politician (1807–1890), son of Pierre Daru
 DARU (journal), an academic journal
 Daru (food), a food eaten in Bhutan
 Daru (surname)
 Daru, Iran, a village in Hormozgan Province, Iran
 Daru, Sierra Leone, a town in Sierra Leone
 Daru-Kharika, a village in Jharkhand, India
 Daru, Hazaribagh, a village in Jharkhand, India
 Daru (community development block), in Jharkhand, India
 Daru or daaru, is the colloquial term for alcoholic beverages in Hindi, Punjabi and many other Indian languages
 Daru or Dvru is a variety of the Rawang language, spoken in northern Myannmar